The Twentieth Century Society (C20) is a British charity which campaigns for the preservation of architectural heritage from 1914 onwards. The society's interests embrace buildings and artefacts that characterise 20th-century Britain. It is formally recognised as one of the National Amenity Societies, and as such is a statutory consultee on alterations to listed buildings within its period of interest, and must be notified of any proposed work to a listed building which involves any element of demolition.

The society was formed as The Thirties Society in 1979, the year in which the prominent "Thirties – British art and design before the War" exhibition was shown at the Hayward Gallery. Its establishment was inspired by and loosely modelled on the Victorian Society, which aims to protect pre-1914 Victorian and Edwardian buildings. Bevis Hillier was the first president, and Clive Aslet the first honorary secretary. In 1992, the society changed its name to The Twentieth Century Society, as it was felt that "Thirties Society" failed to indicate its interest in the protection of buildings from other periods as well.

Notable cases and campaigns
The catalyst for establishing the society in 1979 was the proposal to replace Sir Edwin Cooper's classical 1928 building for Lloyd's of London with a new building by Richard Rogers. The society's protests were too late, and Rogers' Lloyd's building was completed in 1986 (and was itself listed Grade I in 2011).
The society's first serious high-profile case was that of the Art Deco Firestone tyre factory of 1928 on the Great West Road in West London. The building was demolished by its owners over a bank holiday weekend in August 1980, in anticipation of it being listed.
In 1985–6, the society campaigned against the wholesale replacement of the traditional K-series red telephone boxes designed by Sir Giles Gilbert Scott between 1926 and 1936. The campaign attracted much public support, and led to a number of boxes being listed.
In 1987, the society successfully campaigned for the listing of Bracken House in London, the former home of the Financial Times, designed by Sir Albert Richardson and built between 1955 and 1958. This was the first post-Second World War building to be listed, the previous cut-off date having been 1939. 
In 1993–4, the society successfully persuaded the National Trust to take into care and open to the public 2 Willow Road in Hampstead, completed in 1939, and designed by the Hungarian architect Ernő Goldfinger for his own occupation. 
 In the 1980s and 1990s, the society campaigned repeatedly for the preservation and listing of Bankside Power Station, designed by Sir Giles Gilbert Scott, constructed in two phases in 1947–52 and 1958–63, and decommissioned in 1981. The campaign was ultimately successful, and the building reopened as the Tate Modern art gallery in 2000.
 The multi-year campaigns for the protection and listing of Building Design Partnership's Preston bus station, constructed in 1969, which was granted listed status in September 2013.
 After cladding at the Trinity Laban Centre in Deptford, southeast London was damaged by Storm Eunice in February 2022, the society repeated 2020 calls for the building to be listed so that any repairs respected the building's design quality. If it was added to the Heritage List for England it would become its first 21st century building.
 In 2023, the society campaigned to prevent the demolition of the NCP Rupert Street car park in Bristol. The car park, which was built in 1959–1960, was set to be replaced with a 21-storey apartment building, but the society argued that the car park should be preserved because it was a "good example of an absolutely pivotal building type from the 20th century".

Publications
The society published a journal between 1981 and 2018; initially entitled The Thirties Society Journal it became Twentieth Century Architecture from 1994.

References

External links
 
 

Organizations established in 1979
Clubs and societies in the United Kingdom
Architecture organisations based in the United Kingdom
Arts organisations based in the United Kingdom
Heritage organisations in the United Kingdom
Historical societies of the United Kingdom
Historic preservation
Architecture groups
Charities based in London
Modernist architecture
Modernist architecture in the United Kingdom
Art Deco architecture in the United Kingdom
Streamline Moderne architecture in the United Kingdom
Brutalist architecture in the United Kingdom
Conservation and restoration organizations
International style architecture in the United Kingdom
British architectural history
1979 establishments in the United Kingdom